This is a list of the most expensive cars sold in public auto auctions through the traditional bidding process, that of those that attracted headline grabbing publicity, mainly for the high price their new owners have paid.

On May 5, 2022, in a secret auction at the brand’s museum in Germany, Mercedes-Benz sold one of just two 1955 300 SLR Uhlenhaut coupes from its extensive collection of historical automobiles—which dates back to the earliest days of the car in the late 19th century. The sale, to a private buyer, was for 135 million euros ($142,769,250). It handily outstripped the previous record-setting $48.4-million sale of a 1962 Ferrari 250 GTO at a 2018 auction to become the most expensive car ever sold at auction. Both of these high-dollar sales were brokered by RM Sotheby’s. 

On June 1, 2018, it was announced that a 1963 Ferrari 250 GTO had sold for $70 million at a private auction, at the time a world record.

This list only consists of those that have been sold for at least $4 million in auction sales during a traditional bidding process, inclusive of the mandatory buyers premium and does not include private, unsuccessful (failing to reach its reserve price, incomplete) and out of auction sales.

Common contributing factors
Common contributing factors affecting the value of auctioned automobiles include:
 Low production volumes and rarity (limited supply)
 Desirability (increased demand)
 aesthetic design, even of its time
 Nostalgia, known as the generation effect; collectors in their prime earning years, being able to afford a seven figure car, are likely to buy cars that they are born to identify themselves with.
 Typically sport cars are generally more expensive than comparable engined sedans (also known as saloons), therefore more desirable. The same applies to roadsters over sedans. Luxury cars, however, because of their higher price tag, are on a higher end of the scale.
 Condition, also complete documentation (such as evidence of its restoration) of the car is vital for its value. It is not unusual for these cars to have undergone restoration work in the past costing hundreds of thousands, if not millions, of dollars.
 Winning a prestigious auto show helps the car's value, this was the case for some of the cars listed below have been cited to had taken overall or class wins at the Pebble Beach Concours d'Elegance.
 Originality, typically a car that had its original mechanical components, as it was when it left the factory, is more desirable to the one that doesn't. Original bodyshell retains the value better to one fitted with a new body but the chassis of the car is more considered by collectors.
 Cars equipped with automatic transmission are considered to be less desirable than its manual counterpart.
 Cars that have been freshly restored or hidden away for a number of years or decades makes the car desirable to a show winner or a famous car.
 Eligibility to vintage events is a factor to prices as collectors typically buy vintage race cars to enter historic events as are cars that can be designed to be driven on the street but are competitive on the track.
 The originality of the car is considered important in historic racing due to the Historic Technical Passports and FIA Heritage Certificates in force, meaning cars must retain mechanical systems that belonged to the car of the period to prevent unfair advantages.
 Cars with a strong motorsport history improve on the car's desirability, better if the car have won a prestigious race such as the 24 Hours of Le Mans, the Formula One World Championship and the Indianapolis 500. An example would be the Ferrari 330 TRI/LM Spider that was sold for $9.25 million in 2007, which was the  winner of the 24 hours classic. Note that sportcar racers makes up the majority of competition cars on the main list.
 A car associated with a famous person adds value to its price. Examples are:
 Elton John in 2001 auctioned his large collection, as a result of his fame, a majority of those sold at twice their appraised sale-price estimates.
 In 2008, TV presenter and radio personality Chris Evans broke a twenty-one-year-old record, when he successfully placed a bid for a Ferrari 250 GT SWB California Spider that once belonged to James Coburn.
A week after the auction it was revealed to be the limousine of the President of Finland Carl Mannerheim (not Hitler). The same Mercedes went on to surpass its own record months later despite this error in its historical prominence.
 On the other hand, a car belonging to a celebrity who is implicated in a credibility damaging scandal is likely to be worth less. An example of this is the Rolls-Royce Corniche belonging to British TV and radio personality, Jimmy Savile; in light of his sexual abuse scandal following his death, the car is speculated by the motoring trade to be worthless. However, the white 1993 Ford Bronco, that was involved in the chase between O. J. Simpson and LAPD, was sold for $75,000 in 2004, almost twice its original value, ten years after the incident.
 On the other hand, as above, a car that is associated with a famous otherwise factory-backed racing team, such as Scuderia Ferrari, which was the case in August 2011 when one of their factory Ferrari 250 Testa Rossa broke a new record, surpassing the record held by another car of the same model two years before, which was a customer car.
 Auctions taking place during the annual Monterey Historics events every mid-August are generally expected to bring in record sale prices as they are considered to be the hotpoint for collectors and investors who prefer to attend the events, awaiting the outcome. In general, however, auctions are not likely to result in statistically significant price increases when compared to publicly available private sale records of the same model in equivalent condition.

World economy affecting car values
Aside those mentioned above, the world economy is the other main factor to the value of collectible cars as classic cars are frequently regarded as an alternative investment.

The market began in the 1970s when used Ferraris were exported to Italian exotic car dealers in the United States who were willing to buy every vehicle which they were offered. During the 1973 oil crisis (when prices of exotic cars plummeted rapidly), almost new and top-of-range models frequented in used car lots, a Lamborghini Miura could be bought for $15,000 at the time. After a period of ups and downs in the 1970s and early 1980s, interest rates eased, meaning highly desirable exotic cars whose decals once frequented bedroom walls of collectible car fans suddenly became affordable.

During the 1980s boom, investors frequented auctions, causing prices to skyrocket. When cars were sold, they were commonly shifted to storage for investors intending to eventually profit on their accrued collectors value. The high prices drove enthusiasts away from the market, and cars passed from investor to investor with little or no profit gained. The 1980s boom was followed by 1990s bust, and the values of classic cars plummeted, causing most owners to lose considerable portions of their investment portfolio values.

According to the November 1997 issue of Car Magazine, the Ferrari F40 was credited for sparking the price speculation craze.

During the height of the Japanese asset price bubble in the late 1980s, when the yen had strengthened from an exchange rate of about 300 yen per one U.S. dollar in 1985 to about 150 yen per U.S. dollar in 1989, wealthy Japanese buyers began to buy classic cars for effectively half the previous cost in yen. One example of this occurred in 1989, a Ferrari 250 GTO (3909GT) was privately sold to Takeo Kato for $13,837,500. When the bubble burst, it was resold to Talacrest, an Egham (in Surrey) based Ferrari dealer for $2.7m in 1994, and was eventually sold again to David Morrison (a London-based American) for an estimated $3.5 million. It was most recently passed on in 2001 to John Mozart, via private sale in exchange for a Ferrari 250 TR, who acquired it for an estimated price of $7,000,000.

Although in general, prices of collectible cars have slightly recessed as a result of the recent recession, prices for most high-end collector cars have held their value or continued to rise. Since the 1990s recession, values of the most desirable cars have risen by at least 200%. This changing trend in value fluctuation can be attributed to most investors thoroughly researching the cars they are interested prior to purchase, in contrast to the short-sighted, spontaneous purchases which destabilized the collectible car market during the 1980s.

Between 2005 and 2010, the value of vintage cars have increased by an average of 21%, according to Dietrich Hatlapa of the HAGI Index (Historic Automobile Group International).

One of the largest challenges faced by those who invest in collectible cars is the risk of immediate devaluation following an automobile accident which causes physical damage to the vehicle. The most expensive car crash in recorded motoring history was caused by Christopher Cox, who crashed while driving his Ferrari 250 GTO and completely destroyed its front end. The car itself has an estimated value of approximately $30 million (USD) prior to the incident.

Interactive graph

Absolute record

Notes

References

External links
 Top 100 Cars at Auction (including those unsold) (incomplete)

 Cars Auction 

Lists of cars
Cars, Auction
Auction-related lists
Conservation and restoration of vehicles